Mariner Mars '71 can refer to two American spaceprobes:

Mariner 8
Mariner 9